Poly was a website created by Google for users to browse, distribute, and download 3D objects. It was launched in 2017 and intended to allow creators to easily share and access 3D objects. It featured a free library containing thousands of 3D objects for use in virtual reality and augmented reality applications. On December 2, 2020, it was announced that Poly would be shutting down on June 30, 2021, with the ability to upload 3D models to be suspended on April 30, 2021.

Features 
Users could search the Poly model library by specific keywords and upload or download models in the OBJ file format. Most models could be "remixed" using Tilt Brush and Google Blocks application integration; the remixed object was automatically published on Poly with credit and links to the original creator. 3D objects could be viewed using Google Cardboard or Daydream View. Users could also create simple animated GIFs of the objects available for download.

API 
On November 30, 2017, Google released the Poly API. It allowed developers to easily integrate 3D objects into their projects, and provided users access to the object library while the app itself is running. The API also allowed uploading 3D objects directly to Poly with the Poly Upload API. The API could be used for web, Android, and iOS apps, while the Poly Toolkit was required for Unity and Unreal developers.

See also
WebGL
Facebook 3D Posts
Remix 3D
TurboSquid
Sketchfab

References 

2017 software
Google services
Google
3D publishing